, also known as the Manshuin Monzeki, is a Tendai temple located near the Shugakuin Imperial Villa at Sakyō-ku, Ichijo-ji, Takenouchi-cho, in northeast Kyoto, Japan.

The temple was founded by Dengyō Daishi in the 8th century. It was then located near Mount Hiei and known as Tobibo, but renamed Manshuin in 1108 or 1109. In the early Edo period the temple moved to its current site. Today the temple is notable both for its buildings and a fine garden – the gardens of the Manshu-in shoin are a nationally designated Place of Scenic Beauty.

The entry building contains a Tiger Room with images said to have been painted by Kanō Eitoku 狩野 永徳 (1543–1590), Bamboo Room with  Edo wood-block prints, and Peacock Room with pictures by Ganku 岸駒 (1749/56–1839). The main temple hall (Great Shoin) dates from the early Edo period, and is now listed as an Important Cultural Property. It contains a Waterfall Room with slides by Kanō Tan'yū 狩野探幽 (1602–1674), and Snowy Scenes Room with screen pictures by the same artist and shelves much like those in the Katsura Imperial Villa. The smaller hall (Small Shoin) is also an important culture property; it contains the Mount Fuji Room (pictures by Kanō Tanyū on the sliding doors); Twilight Room with royal throne and more paintings by Kano; and a tea room.

The temple's major garden is in the Karesansui (枯山水) style, and now designated as an eminent scenery; it contains a notable Pinus pentaphylla tree, now about 400 years old, set within an "island" on a stream of white sand. The inner garden is quite small, and features a stone basin and old well.

See also

List of National Treasures of Japan (paintings)
List of National Treasures of Japan (writings)

References

 Manshuin Monzeki, undated brochure from the temple (August 2007).
 Jgarden.com article

Places of Scenic Beauty
Buddhist temples in Kyoto
Important Cultural Properties of Japan
Tendai temples
Monzeki